Khyber Patrol is a 1954 American adventure film directed by Seymour Friedman and starring Richard Egan, Dawn Addams and Raymond Burr. The plot focuses on British troops on the Afghanistan border. It was distributed by United Artists as a second feature. The film is similar in theme to King of the Khyber Rifles starring Tyrone Power and Bengal Brigade starring Rock Hudson.

Synopsis

Captain Kyle Cameron, a Canadian serving with the 11th Lancers at Peshawar on the North-West Frontier is reprimanded by his superiors for offending an Afghan leader Ishak Khan and forced to apologize. Cameron still suspects Khan of being in league with the Russians who are attempting to stir up trouble in the Khyber Pass region. Cameron is tricked into sending some men, including his rival for their general daughter Diana Melville, to their deaths. He deliberately gets himself dismissed from the service so that he can infiltrate the Khan's forces and seek revenge.

Cast
Richard Egan as Captain Kyle Cameron
Dawn Addams as Diana Melville
Patric Knowles as Lieutenant George Kennerly 
Raymond Burr as  Captain Ahmed Shir
Donald Randolph as Prince Ishak Khan
Paul Cavanagh as Brigadier Melville
Philip Tonge as Colonel Rivington
 Patrick O'Moore as Capt. Buzz Broussard
 Laura Mason as 	The Harem Girl
 Charlita as The Dancing Girl
 Robin Hughes as Tall Major in Lounge

References

Bibliography
 Richards, Jeffrey. Visions of Yesterday. Routledge & Kegan Paul, 1973.

External links

1954 films
American adventure films
1950s English-language films
1954 adventure films
Films directed by Seymour Friedman
Films set in Afghanistan
Films set in the British Raj
Films set in Peshawar
American black-and-white films
British Empire war films
Films produced by Edward Small
United Artists films
1950s American films
Films with screenplays by Richard Schayer